ACF Milan (Associazione Calcio Femminile Milan) was a women's football club based in Milan.

This team had not been concerned with any of the following teams:
AC Milan (men's team founded in 1899);
A.C. Milan Women (known as "Milan Women": (born in 2018).
Associazione Calcio Femminile Milan 82 (known as "Milan 82": born 1982-1994 ceased)
Mediolanum Milan Associazione Calcio Femminile (known as "Mediolanum Milan": born 2013-2016 ceased)
Società Sportiva Dilettantistica Football Milan Ladies (known as "Milan ladies": (born 2013-2018 ceased);

History
Founded in 1965, the team won the FFIGC championship in 1970 and remained successful after the unification of the FICF and FFIGC championships into the Serie A, winning two championships and two national cups between 1973 and 1976, including a double in 1975. However the team played most of the 1980s in Serie B. 1988 marked Milan's return to Serie A, but the team subsequently chained two relegations, ending in third-tier Serie C.

In 1994 Milan returned to Serie A, where it remained for the next 15 years. The rossoneri briefly rose to the championship's elite in the late 90s, winning its 3rd Cup and its 4th Championship in 1998 and 1999 respectively, plus two Supercups. However, through the 2000s the team ended usually in mid table positions, with a 3rd spot in 2004 as its best result. In 2009 it was relegated.

After two years in Serie A2, Milan returned to Serie A for the 2011–12 season, but it couldn't avoid relegation. In 2013 the team went into administration then ceased every activity.

Honours

Titles
 Italian League (4)
 1970, 1973, 1975, 1999
 Italian Cup (3)
 1975, 1976, 1998
 Italian Supercup (2)
 1998, 1999

National competition record

1 Voluntarily relegated

See also
 :Category:ACF Milan players

References

Milan
Milan
Football clubs in Milan
Italian football clubs established in 1965
Serie A (women's football) clubs
Association football clubs disestablished in 2013
2013 disestablishments in Italy